Tokyo Nights may refer to:

 "Tokyo Nights", song by the Bee Gees from the album One
 "Tokyo Nights", song by Digital Farm Animals and Dragonette
 "Tokyo Nights", song by Krokus from the album Metal Rendez-vous

See also 
 Tokyo (disambiguation)